This is a list of National Historic Landmarks in Virginia. There are currently 123 National Historic Landmarks (NHLs), and 2 former NHLs.

Current landmarks

The National Historic Landmarks (NHLs) are widely distributed across  Virginia's 95 counties and 39 independent cities.

|}

Former National Historic Landmarks

See also
 National Register of Historic Places listings in Virginia
 United States National Park Service areas in Virginia
 List of National Historic Landmarks by state

References

External links

 
Historic sites in Virginia
National Historic Landmarks
Virginia
National Historic Landmarks